James Joseph Tuthill (born March 25, 1976) is a former American football placekicker in the National Football League for the San Diego Chargers and the Washington Redskins.  He played college football at California Polytechnic State University.

Early life 
After graduating from Upland High, Tuthill went on to placekick and punt for Cal Poly, earning second-team All American West Conference selection as a senior.

Professional football 
Tuthill signed with Washington on September 10, 2002.

References

1976 births
Living people
People from Upland, California
American football placekickers
Cal Poly Mustangs football players
San Diego Chargers players
Sportspeople from San Bernardino County, California
Jacksonville Jaguars players
Washington Redskins players
Players of American football from California
Minnesota Vikings players